Total Quality Logistics (TQL) is a North American freight brokerage and third-party logistics firm.    It was founded in 1997 by Ken Oaks in Cincinnati, Ohio, and is headquartered in Union Township, Clermont County, Ohio. As of 2021, TQL is the largest private company in greater Cincinnati according to the Cincinnati Enquirer and American City Business Journals. 

TQL is the world's 19th largest third-party logistics provider (3PL) that provides global transportation services including full truckload (FTL), less-than-truckload (LTL), intermodal, warehousing, drayage, drop trailer, oversize/overweight, Mexico cross-border, customs, Canada cross-border, hazmat, partials and other specialized logistic services.

As of 2022, TQL was ranked the second-largest freight brokerage firm in North America by Transport Topics magazine, posting $1.4 billion in net revenue off gross revenues of $7.8 billion.
TQL has 56 offices in 26 states with more than 9,000 employees. 

TQL has been ranked a Greater Cincinnati Top Places to Work 12 times. In 2019 and 2018 TQL was ranked a Fortune 100 Best Companies to Work For. The company is a five time winner of the Fortune Best Workplaces for Millennials award. 

In February 2022, TQL and the Government of Kentucky Economic Development Cabinet announced intentions to create 525 new jobs across the state. 

In March 2022, in partnership with the state of Ohio, Lt. Governor Jon Husted,JobsOhio, REDI Cincinnati, Clermont County, Ohio and Union Township, Clermont County, Ohio, TQL announced the intention to create 1,000 new jobs in southwest Ohio and expand their headquarters.

Supply Chain Crisis Response 
In September 2020, in response to the COVID-19 pandemic, the company pledged $1 million dollars through its Moves That Matter program which covers the cost of transportation of donated freight. The company later upped the commitment to $2 million. The company received recognition from the American Chemistry Council for outstanding COVID-19 response. In 2021, TQL also committed to hiring over 1,000 new employees nationwide in response to the transportation demand that was caused by the pandemic.    

In February 2023, TQL was awarded as a finalist for the Engage for Good Halo Awards for "Emergency Crisis/Initiative" for their Moves that Matter charitable program, which moves donated goods at no cost. Other finalists were United Parcel Service; PayPal; Humble Bundle, Razomfor Ukraine, International Rescue Committee,International Medical Corps and Direct Relief.

Headquarters Campus 
In 2021, the company grew its corporate headquarters in Union Township, Ohio with a $20 million 133,000 square foot expansion.  The expansion includes the biggest American flag (30’x60’) and tallest flagpole (160’) in Ohio, Kentucky and Indiana. 

In December 2022, the company broke ground on a headquarters expansion, which is expected to open in summer of 2024.

Sponsorships 
In 2021, the company announced stadium naming rights for TQL Stadium, the home of Major League Soccer's FC Cincinnati.

In 2023, TQL announced a contribution and partnership with University of Cincinnati athletics.

References

Logistics companies of the United States
Companies based in Cincinnati
American companies established in 1997
Transportation companies based in Ohio
Transport companies established in 1997
1997 establishments in Ohio
Privately held companies based in Ohio